Guernsey Gâche is a local dish of the Channel Island of Guernsey. It is a special bread made with raisins, sultanas, cherries and mixed peel. In Guernésiais, gâche means cake.

External links
Recipe from BBC Radio Guernsey

Sweet breads
Yeast breads
Brioches
Guernsey culture